Elsa Sjunneson (born 1985) is an American speculative fiction writer, editor, media critic, and disability rights activist. She is a Hugo Award and Aurora Award winner through her editorial work on Uncanny Magazine. Deafblind since birth, Sjunneson writes and speaks extensively about the representation of disabilities in popular culture.

Biography 
Elsa Sjunneson was born in 1985. She was born with congenital rubella syndrome, resulting in hearing loss, cataracts in both eyes, and a heart defect. She is legally blind and wears a prosthetic eye and bilateral hearing aids.

She attended Gonzaga University, earning a bachelor's degree in history in 2008. While at Gonzaga she worked to raise awareness for FACE AIDS. Sjunneson went on to earn a master's degree in women's history from Sarah Lawrence College in 2011.

Sjunneson is an adjunct professor at the New Jersey Institute of Technology Department of Humanities, where she teaches writing. She lives in Seattle, Washington.

Writing and media criticism
Sjunneson writes in multiple genres, including speculative fiction and nonfiction.

She is a game designer and writes about inclusive game design. Sjunneson was the lead developer and creative director of the Fate Accessibility Toolkit. In a 2019 article in Dragon+ magazine, she discusses inclusionary practices for accommodating disabled players in tabletop role-playing games.

Sjunneson frequently writes about the representation of disability in popular culture. "Constructing Blindness," a series of essays for Tor.com, discuss blindness as it is represented in movies and television shows. She has written essays about her own disabilities for CNN and The Boston Globe. Sjunneson's memoir Being Seen: One Deafblind Woman's Fight to End Ableism, published in October 2021, explores cultural perceptions of disability along with her own experience.

Awards
Sjunneson has been a Hugo Award finalist seven times for her writing and editorial work. She won the Hugo Award for Best Fan Writer in 2021.  She was a guest of honor at CONvergence in 2021. Sjunneson was a nominee for the 2019 Nebula Award for Best Game Writing for the Fate Accessibility Toolkit. Sjunneson was also nominated for the 2022 Hugo Award for Best Related Work for Being Seen: One Deafblind Woman's Fight to End Ableism.

As the nonfiction editor of Disabled People Destroy Science Fiction, issue 24 of Uncanny Magazine, Sjunneson won the 2019 Hugo Award for Best Semiprozine and the 2019 Aurora Award for Best Related Work. As an editorial staff member of Uncanny Magazine, she was a winner of the 2019 British Fantasy Award for Best Magazine / Periodical. She was the first blind person to win a Hugo Award (although Edmund Meskys, editor of Hugo-winning Niekas, became blind after his Hugo win).

References

External links 
Official website

1985 births
20th-century American women writers
Living people
American fantasy writers
American people with disabilities
American science fiction writers
American deafblind people
American disability rights activists
Gonzaga University alumni
Hugo Award-winning fan writers
Sarah Lawrence College alumni
Women science fiction and fantasy writers
Blind academics